Kate Barker (born 1957) is a British economist.

Kate Barker may also refer to:

 Ma Barker (1873–1935), American criminal sometimes known as Kate Barker
 Kate Barker, singer in American pop girl group Girl Authority

See also
 Katharine Barker (disambiguation)
 Catherine Barker, British figure skater
 Katherine Barker (disambiguation)